HMS Winchelsea was a 32-gun fifth-rate  frigate of the Royal Navy, and was the sixth Royal Navy ship to bear this name (or its archaic form Winchelsey).  She was ordered during the Seven Years' War, but completed too late for that conflict. She cost £11,515-18-0d to build.

Career

HMS Winchelsea was brought into service in February 1769, under Captain Samuel Goodall and sailed for service to the Mediterranean. In December 1769 she struck rocks off Cádiz, Spain and was severely damaged. Refloated, she was taken in to Gibraltar for repairs. Command was passed to Captain Thomas Wilkinson in June 1771 with the ship remaining at her Mediterranean station.

In June 1775 she was paid off and returned to Sheerness Dockyard to be placed in ordinary.

She saw later service during the American War of Independence. On 31 May, 1778 she captured an unknown sloop, and possibly privateer "Rose", 27  leagues south of Cape Hatteras. 
Served until 1794, and was refitted as a troop ship at Portsmouth Dockyard in 1799–1800. Because Winchelsea served in the Navy's Egyptian campaign (8 March to 2 September 1801), her officers and crew qualified for the clasp "Egypt" to the Naval General Service Medal that the Admiralty authorised in 1850 for all surviving claimants.

Fate
She became a convalescent ship at Sheerness in 1803, finally being sold there to be broken up in November 1814.

Notes

Citations

References
 
 Lavery, Brian (2003) The Ship of the Line – Volume 1: The development of the battlefleet 1650–1850. Conway Maritime Press. .
 Winfield, Rif (2007) British Warships in the Age of Sail, 1714-1792. Seaforth Publishing. .

 

Ships built in Sheerness
1764 ships
Fifth-rate frigates of the Royal Navy
Maritime incidents in 1769